Northern Province is one of Rwanda's five provinces. It was created in early January 2006 as part of a government decentralization program that re-organized the country's local government structures.

Northern Province comprises most of the former provinces of Ruhengeri and Byumba, along with northern portions of Kigali Rural. It is divided into the districts of Burera, Gicumbi, Gakenke, Musanze, and Rulindo.

The capital city of Northern Province is Musanze.

The province's official languages are English, French and Kinyarwanda.

The governor, appointed by presidential decree, is currently Hon. Dancilla Nyirarugero.

The preceding governors of Northern province were Gatabazi Jean Marie Vianney, Claude Musabyimana, Bosenibamwe Aimée, Boniface Rucagu,  formerly governor of Ruhengeri Province.

References

External links 
 

 
Provinces of Rwanda
States and territories established in 2006